John Louis Crommelin-Brown (20 October 1888 – 11 September 1953) was an English schoolmaster, poet and first-class cricketer who played for Derbyshire between 1922 and 1926.

Crommelin-Brown was born in Delhi, India, and educated first in Edinburgh at the Edinburgh Academy and Cargilfield School and then in England at Winchester College. On leaving Winchester in 1908 he published Wykehamian Poems and Parodies  which included parodies of Rudyard Kipling, Longfellow and Walt Whitman. He went to Cambridge University, where he wrote lyrics for the Cambridge Footlights During the First World War he served as a lieutenant in the Royal Garrison Artillery and wrote war poetry.

Crommelin-Brown became a master at Repton School and made his debut for Derbyshire in the 1922 season. In his debut match against Worcestershire he scored 56 and took a wicket. He did not play again until the 1924 season, and he only played during the school holidays in that and the 1925 and 1926 seasons. He was a right hand batsman and played 28 innings in 16 first-class matches. His highest score was 74 and his average 25.34. He bowled rarely, taking one wicket in total.

Crommelin-Brown died at Old Town, Minehead, Somerset, England, aged 64.

Crommelin-Brown's son-in-law John Eggar, another Repton master, played cricket for Derbyshire after the Second World War.

Publications
Wykehamian Poems and Parodies  
Dies Heroica: War Poems 1914–1918
Three Little Fairy Songs. 1. The Fairy Children. 2. Canterbury Bells. 3. Blue-Bell, Dew-Bell.

References

1888 births
1953 deaths
People educated at Edinburgh Academy
People educated at Cargilfield School
People educated at Winchester College
Alumni of the University of Cambridge
Derbyshire cricketers
Royal Garrison Artillery officers
British Army personnel of World War I
British World War I poets
20th-century male writers
People from Delhi
Military personnel of British India